Copper Canyon Conspiracy is a Hardy Boys and Nancy Drew Supermystery crossover novel. It was first published in 1994.

Plot summary
Nancy Drew is in Tucson to watch her friend George run in the Cactus Marathon. Among the entrants is Tasio Humada, a native Tarahumara from Chihuahua, Mexico. When Nancy learns that he has received several death threats, possibly tied to his people's dispute with the lumber mills in his country, she decides to see him safely back to Mexico. But her help may have come too late. Soon after crossing the border, Tasio is arrested for the murder of a powerful logging baron. 

Meanwhile, Joe Hardy, who also ran in the marathon, and his brother, Frank, head to the sprawling ranch belonging to the family of Cory Weston. For while the threats were directed at Tasio, it was Cory, running at his side, who paid the price, nearly killed by a boulder thrown in his path. As the truth behind the attacks gradually unfolds, Nancy and the Hardys expose a tangle of greed, bribery, and corruption stretching from southern Arizona to the Sierra Madre.

References

External links
Copper Canyon Conspiracy at Fantastic Fiction
Supermystery series books

Supermystery
1994 American novels
1994 children's books
Novels set in Arizona
Novels set in Mexico